This is an incomplete list of Statutory Instruments of the Welsh Assembly made in 2008. Statutory Instruments made by the Assembly are numbered in the main United Kingdom series with their own sub-series. The Welsh language has official equal status with the English language in Wales so every Statutory Instrument made by the Assembly is officially published in both English and Welsh. Only the titles of the English-language version are reproduced here. The Statutory Instruments are secondary legislation, deriving their power from the Acts of Parliament establishing and transferring functions and powers to the Welsh Assembly.

1-100

 Planning and Compulsory Purchase Act 2004 (Commencement No. 4 and Consequential, Transitional and Savings Provisions) (Wales) (Amendment No. 1) Order 2008 W.4
 Childcare Act 2006 (Commencement No. 1) (Wales) Order 2008 W.6
 Non-Domestic Rating (Demand Notices) (Wales) (Amendment) Regulations 2008 W.7
 Plastic Materials and Articles in Contact with Food (Lid Gaskets) (Wales) Regulations 2008 W.11
 Street Works (Registers, Notices, Directions and Designations) (Wales) Regulations 2008 W.14
 Street Works (Fixed Penalty) (Wales) Regulations 2008 W.15
 Sheep and Goats (Records, Identification and Movement) (Wales) Order 2008 W.17
 Control of School Premises (Wales) Regulations 2008 W.18
 Condensed Milk and Dried Milk (Wales) (Amendment) Regulations 2008 W.19
 Miscellaneous Food Additives and the Sweeteners in Food (Amendment) (Wales) Regulations 2008 W.20
 Collaboration Between Maintained Schools (Wales) Regulations 2008 W.21
 Childcare Act 2006 (Local Authority Assessment) (Wales) Regulations 2008 W.22
 Childcare Act 2006 (Provision of Information) (Wales) Regulations 2008 W.23
 Fire and Rescue Authorities (Improvement Plans) (Wales) Order 2008 W.25
 Education (School Teachers' Qualifications) (Amendment) (Wales) Regulations 2008 W.26
 Local Government (Politically Restricted Posts) (Wales) Regulations 2008 W.27
 Road Traffic (Permitted Parking Area and Special Parking Area) (County Borough of Wrexham) Order 2008 W.28
 Agricultural Holdings (Units of Production) (Wales) Order 2008 W.29
 Rent Repayment Orders (Supplementary Provisions) (Wales) Regulations 2008 W.30
 Housing (Right to Buy) (Priority of Charges) (Wales) Order 2008 W.37
 Welsh Levy Board Order 2008 W.39
 Fire and Rescue Authorities (Best Value Performance Indicators) (Wales) Order 2008 W.40
 Street Works (Fixed Penalty) (Wales) (Amendment) Regulations 2008 W.41
 Local Authorities (Alteration of Requisite Calculations) (Wales) Regulations 2008 W.42
 Town and Country Planning (General Permitted Development) (Amendment) (Wales) Order 2008 W.43
 Local Government (Best Value Performance Indicators) (Wales) Order 2008 W.44
 Education (Assisted Places) (Amendment) (Wales) Regulations 2008 W.45
 Education (Assisted Places) (Incidental Expenses) (Amendment) (Wales) Regulations 2008 W.46
 Control of Salmonella in Poultry (Wales) Order 2008 W.50
 Street Works (Registers, Notices, Directions and Designations) (Wales) (No. 2) Regulations 2008 W.52
 Honey (Wales) (Amendment) Regulations 2008 W.53
 Control of School Premises (Wales) (Amendment) Regulations 2008 W.55
 National Health Service (Optical Charges and Payments) and (General Ophthalmic Services) (Amendment) (Wales) Regulations 2008 W.56
 Powys (Communities) Order 2008 W.58
 Local Authorities (Capital Finance and Accounting) (Wales) (Amendment) Regulations 2008 W.59
 Local Government and Public Involvement in Health Act 2007 (Commencement) (Wales) Order 2008 W.60
 Street Works (Inspection Fees) (Wales) (Amendment) Regulations 2008 W.62
 Removal and Disposal of Vehicles (Amendment) (Wales) Regulations 2008 W.64
 Civil Enforcement of Parking Contraventions (Guidelines on Levels of Charges) (Wales) Order 2008 W.65
 Civil Enforcement of Parking Contraventions (General Provisions) (Wales) Regulations 2008 W.66
 Civil Enforcement of Parking Contraventions (Representations and Appeals) Removed Vehicles (Wales) Regulations 2008 W.67
 Civil Enforcement Officers (Wearing of Uniforms) (Wales) Regulations 2008 W.68
 Civil Enforcement of Parking Contraventions (Approved Devices) (Wales) Order 2008 W.69
 National Health Service (Optical Charges and Payments) (Amendment) (Wales) Regulations 2008 W.70
 Dairy Produce Quotas (Wales) (Amendment) Regulations 2008 W.72
 Hywel Dda National Health Service Trust (Establishment) Order 2008 W.73
 Meat Products (Wales) (Amendment) Regulations 2008 W,74
 Abertawe Bro Morgannwg University National Health Service Trust (Establishment) Order 2008 W.75
 Cwm Taf National Health Service Trust (Establishment) Order 2008 W.76
 Rice Products from the United States of America (Restriction on First Placing on the Market) (Wales) Regulations 2008 W.80
 Local Authorities (Model Code of Conduct) (Wales) Order 2008 W.82
 Transport of Animals (Cleansing and Disinfection) (Wales) (No. 3) (Amendment) Order 2008 W.83
 North Glamorgan National Health Service Trust (Transfer of Staff, Property, Rights and Liabilities) Order 2008 W.87
 Pontypridd and Rhondda National Health Service Trust (Transfer of Staff, Property, Rights and Liabilities) Order 2008 W.88
 Swansea National Health Service Trust (Transfer of staff, Property, Rights and Liabilities) Order 2008 W.89
 Bro Morgannwg National Health Service Trust (Transfer of Staff, Property, Rights and Liabilities) Order 2008 W.90
 Carmarthenshire National Health Service Trust (Transfer of Staff, Property, Rights and Liabilities) Order 2008 W.91
 Pontypridd and Rhondda National Health Service Trust (Dissolution) Order 2008 W.92
 Carmarthenshire National Health Service Trust (Dissolution) Order 2008 W.93
 Ceredigion and Mid Wales National Health Service Trust (Dissolution) Order 2008 W.94
 Ceredigion and Mid Wales National Health Service Trust (Transfer of Staff, Property, Rights and Liabilities) Order 2008 W.95
 Pembrokeshire and Derwen National Health Service Trust (Transfer of Staff, Property, Rights and Liabilities) Order 2008 W.96
 Pembrokeshire and Derwen National Health Service Trust (Dissolution) Order 2008 W.97
 Swansea National Health Service Trust (Dissolution) Order 2008 W.98
 Bro Morgannwg National Health Service Trust (Dissolution) Order 2008 W.99
 North Glamorgan National Health Service Trust (Dissolution) Order 2008 W.100

101-200

 Further Education and Training Act 2007 (Commencement No. 2) (Wales) Order 2008 W.108
 Bovine Semen (Wales) Regulations 2008 W.110
 Seed Potatoes (Wales) (Amendment) Regulations 2008 W.112
 Zootechnical Standards (Amendment) (Wales) Regulations 2008 W.113
 Specified Products from China (Restriction on First Placing on the Market) (Wales) Regulations 2008 W.114
 Heather and Grass etc. Burning (Wales) Regulations 2008 W.115
 Bluetongue (Wales) Regulations 2008 W.116
 Transmissible Spongiform Encephalopathies (Wales) (Amendment) Regulations 2008 W.119
 Street Works (Inspection Fees) (Wales) (Amendment) (No. 2) Regulations 2008 W.121
 Civil Enforcement of Parking Contraventions (General Provisions) (Wales) (No. 2) Regulations 2008 W.122
 Civil Enforcement of Parking Contraventions (Approved Devices) (Wales) (No. 2) Order 2008 W.123
 Plastic Materials and Articles in Contact with Food (Wales) Regulations 2008 W.124
 Education (Fees and Awards) (Wales) Regulations 2008 W.126
 Food Labelling (Declaration of Allergens) (Wales) Regulations 2008 W.128
 Specified Animal Pathogens (Wales) Order 2008 W.129
 Assembly Learning Grants and Loans (Higher Education) (Wales) Regulations 2008 W.130
 Products of Animal Origin (Disease Control) (Wales) Regulations 2008 W.132
 Regional Transport Planning (Wales) (Amendment) Order 2008 W.135
 Disease Control (Wales) (Amendment) Order 2008 W.136
 Assembly Learning Grants (European Institutions) (Wales) (Amendment) Regulations 2008 W.137
 National Health Service (General Medical Services Contracts) (Wales) (Amendment) Regulations 2008 W.138
 Abortion (Amendment) (Wales) Regulations 2008 W.140
 Spreadable Fats (Marketing Standards) and the Milk and Milk Products (Protection of Designations) (Wales) Regulations 2008 W.141
 Education (National Curriculum) (Modern Foreign Languages) (Wales) Order 2008 W.145
 Education (National Curriculum) (Attainment Targets and Programmes of Study) (Wales) Order 2008 W.146
 National Health Service (Primary Medical Services) and (Performers Lists) (Miscellaneous Amendments) (Wales) Regulations 2008 W.148
 Education and Inspections Act 2006 (Commencement No. 1 and Saving Provisions) (Wales) Order 2008 W.149
 Tope (Prohibition of Fishing) (Wales) Order 2008 W.150
 Commissioner for Older People in Wales (Amendment) Regulations 2008 W.155
 National Health Service (Travelling Expenses and Remission of Charges) (Wales) (Amendment) Regulations 2008 W.153
 Bluetongue (Wales) (Amendment) Regulations 2008 W.158
 Rice Products from the United States of America (Restriction on First Placing on the Market) (Wales) (Amendment) Regulations 2008 W.159
 North Wales National Health Service Trust (Establishment) Order 2008 W.160
 Plastic Materials and Articles in Contact with Food (Wales) (No.2) Regulations 2008 W.162
 Childcare Act 2006 (Provision of Information) (Wales) (Amendment) Regulations 2008 W.163
 North East Wales National Health Service Trust (Dissolution) Order 2008 W.164
 Conwy and Denbighshire National Health Service Trust (Dissolution) Order 2008 W.165
 Conwy and Denbighshire National Health Service Trust (Transfer of Staff, Property, Rights and Liabilities) Order 2008 W.166
 North East Wales National Health Service Trust (Transfer of Staff, Property, Rights and Liabilities) Order 2008 W.167
 Education Act 2002 (Commencement No. 12) (Wales) Order 2008 W.168
 Education (National Curriculum) (Foundation Stage) (Wales) Order 2008 W.169
 Education (Disapplication of the National Curriculum for Wales at Key Stage 1) (Wales) Regulations 2008 W.170
 Education (School Day and School Year) (Wales) (Amendment) Regulations 2008 W.171
 Pigs (Records, Identification and Movement) (Wales) Order 2008 W.172
 Education (National Curriculum) (Attainment Targets and Programmes of Study) (Wales) (Amendment) Order 2008 W.173
 Feeding Stuffs (Wales) (Amendment) Regulations 2008 W.174
 Shrimp Fishing Nets (Wales) Order 2008 W.175
 Local Authorities (Conduct of Referendums) (Wales) Regulations 2008 W.177
 School Budget Shares (Prescribed Purposes and Consequential Amendments) (Wales) Regulations 2008 W.178
 Civil Enforcement of Parking Contraventions (City and County of Swansea) Designation Order 2008 W.180
 School Curriculum in Wales (Miscellaneous Amendments) Order 2008 W.181
 Children Act 2004 (Commencement No. 8) (Wales) Order 2008 W.182
 Wildlife and Countryside Act 1981 (Variation of Schedule 5) (Wales) Order 2008 W.183
 Private Dentistry (Wales) Regulations 2008 W.185
 Planning and Compulsory Purchase Act 2004 (Commencement No. 4 and Consequential, Transitional and Savings Provisions) (Wales) (Amendment No.2) Order 2008 W.192

External links
 Welsh SI List

2008
2008 in Wales
Welsh Assembly Statutory Instruments